The meridian 44° east of Greenwich is a line of longitude that extends from the North Pole across the Arctic Ocean, Europe, Asia, Africa, the Indian Ocean, the Southern Ocean, and Antarctica to the South Pole.

The 44th meridian east forms a great circle with the 136th meridian west.

From Pole to Pole
Starting at the North Pole and heading south to the South Pole, the 44th meridian east passes through:

{| class="wikitable plainrowheaders"
! scope="col" width="115" | Co-ordinates
! scope="col" | Country, territory or sea
! scope="col" | Notes
|-
| style="background:#b0e0e6;" | 
! scope="row" style="background:#b0e0e6;" | Arctic Ocean
| style="background:#b0e0e6;" |
|-
| style="background:#b0e0e6;" | 
! scope="row" style="background:#b0e0e6;" | Barents Sea
| style="background:#b0e0e6;" |
|-
| 
! scope="row" | 
| Kanin Peninsula
|-
| style="background:#b0e0e6;" | 
! scope="row" style="background:#b0e0e6;" | White Sea
| style="background:#b0e0e6;" |
|-
| 
! scope="row" | 
| Kanin Peninsula
|-
| style="background:#b0e0e6;" | 
! scope="row" style="background:#b0e0e6;" | White Sea
| style="background:#b0e0e6;" | Mezen Bay
|-
| 
! scope="row" | 
| Passing through Nizhny Novgorod
|-valign="top"
| 
! scope="row" |  or 
| South Ossetia is a partially recognised state. Most nations consider its territory to be part of Georgia.
|-
| 
! scope="row" | 
|
|-
| 
! scope="row" | 
|
|-
| 
! scope="row" | 
|
|-
| 
! scope="row" | 
| Passing just west of Erbil
|-
| 
! scope="row" | 
|
|-
| 
! scope="row" | 
|
|-
| style="background:#b0e0e6;" | 
! scope="row" style="background:#b0e0e6;" | Indian Ocean
| style="background:#b0e0e6;" | Gulf of Aden
|-
| 
! scope="row" | 
| Somaliland - passing just west of Hargeisa
|-
| 
! scope="row" | 
|
|-
| 
! scope="row" | 
|
|-valign="top"
| style="background:#b0e0e6;" | 
! scope="row" style="background:#b0e0e6;" | Indian Ocean
| style="background:#b0e0e6;" | Passing between the islands of Mohéli and Anjouan, 
|-
| 
! scope="row" | 
|
|-
| style="background:#b0e0e6;" | 
! scope="row" style="background:#b0e0e6;" | Indian Ocean
| style="background:#b0e0e6;" | 
|-
| 
! scope="row" | 
|
|-
| style="background:#b0e0e6;" | 
! scope="row" style="background:#b0e0e6;" | Indian Ocean
| style="background:#b0e0e6;" |
|-
| style="background:#b0e0e6;" | 
! scope="row" style="background:#b0e0e6;" | Southern Ocean
| style="background:#b0e0e6;" |
|-
| 
! scope="row" | Antarctica
| Queen Maud Land, claimed by 
|-
|}

See also
43rd meridian east
45th meridian east

e044 meridian east